Lucio Dell'Angelo (18 April 1938 — 1 January 2013) was an Italian professional football player and coach.

Dell'Angelo was born in Lucinico, Gorizia, Italy.

After his prolonged illness, Dell'Angelo died on 1 January 2013, in the Versilia hospital in Viareggio, at the age of 74.

References

External links
 

1938 births
2013 deaths
People from Gorizia
Footballers from Friuli Venezia Giulia
Italian footballers
Association football midfielders
A.C. Milan players
U.S. Massese 1919 players
ACF Fiorentina players
U.S. Alessandria Calcio 1912 players
A.C. Prato players
L.R. Vicenza players
Hellas Verona F.C. players
Atalanta B.C. players
Mantova 1911 players
A.C. Monza players
Serie A players
Serie B players
Serie C players
Italian football managers
A.C. Prato managers
A.S.D. Viareggio Calcio managers
Serie C managers